"Ashes of the Dawn" is a song by English power metal band DragonForce. The song was released as the third single from their seventh album Reaching into Infinity, as well as the first music video from that album. The keyboard player, Vadim Pruzhanov, was not present in the music video.

Lyrics
The lyrics sing about a man who's lost in despair and is looking for a way out. He's realizing that it's time for him to make amends and do what's right. At the end of the song, he decides it's time for him to leave the past behind and move on.

References

DragonForce songs
2017 singles
2017 songs
Songs written by Frédéric Leclercq